Léo Cucuel (born 3 June 1987) is a Tahitian coach and badminton player.

Career 
In 2011, he represented Tahiti at the Pacific Games in Nouméa, New Caledonia. In 2016, he won the silver medal at the Oceania Badminton Championships in  the men's doubles event partnered with Rémi Rossi and bronze medal in the mixed team event. He also part of Tahiti team that won the men's team at the Oceania Championships in 2016, 2018, and 2020.

Achievements

Oceania Championships 
Men's doubles

Mixed doubles

Pacific Mini Games 
Men's doubles

References

External links 
 

Living people
1987 births
Tahitian male badminton players
French male badminton players